Blooper is the official mascot for the Atlanta Braves Major League Baseball team. A big, fuzzy creature with extendable ears, he performs various routines to entertain fans during baseball games at Truist Park, and makes public relation and goodwill appearances for the Braves. While some fans were reluctant when Blooper was first introduced, his antics on and off the field soon won fans over in Atlanta.

Creation
Blooper was introduced on January 27, 2018, at the Atlanta Braves fan fest. Blooper succeeded the Braves' "Homer the Brave" mascot after he went into retirement.  According to the Braves, he's a "product of science run amok", meaning Blooper is everything that makes a Braves' superfan that came out of a machine. He's nearly 7-foot tall and wears a 5XL T-shirt. While fan reception was mixed at first, by the time the Braves won the 2021 World Series Blooper was welcomed by Braves fans all over the region.

Performances
Blooper has generated attention on and off the field. In 2019, Blooper pulled off a lucrative stunt by pretending to steal Bryce Harper's $330 million contract. Blooper, sporting a judge's robe and wig, called Harper over into foul territory and showed him a board reading "I declare June 16, 2019 'National Bryce Harper Day.'" When Harper signed the proclamation, Blooper revealed that it was actually a check for $330 million. Blooper also performed a similar trick on Manny Machado during the 2019 season.

During the 2020 COVID-19 shortened season, Blooper dressed up as famous characters like The Mandalorian, Bob Ross, and Guy Fieri. In 2021, Blooper took a shot at the city of Cincinnati by declaring chili doesn't go on spaghetti. The declaration ended up as a feud on Twitter as the Cincinnati Reds and Skyline Chili Twitter accounts responded to Blooper.

After the Braves won the 2021 World Series, Blooper and Braves outfielder Joc Pederson were invited by Georgia Bulldogs football coach Kirby Smart to Athens Georgia. The two were honored during a Georgia Bulldog football game. During a timeout in the game, Pederson and Blooper were cheered by fans when they were introduced on the 10-yard line.

References

Culture of Atlanta
Major League Baseball team mascots
Mascots introduced in 2018
Atlanta Braves